The Bristol Siddeley BS.605 was a British take off assist rocket engine of the mid-1960s that used hydrogen peroxide and kerosene propellant.

Design and development
The BS.605 design was based on the smaller of two combustion chambers of the earlier Armstrong Siddeley Stentor. A pair of retractable BS.605 engines were fitted to Buccaneer S.50 strike aircraft of the South African Air Force for hot and high operations. The BS.605 was also considered for the Bluebird CMN-8, a design for a supersonic land speed record car, to be driven by Donald Campbell.

Applications
Blackburn Buccaneer S.50

Engines on display
A complete BS.605 and exploded working parts of a second engine are on display at the Midland Air Museum.
A preserved BS.605 is part of the engine collection on display at the Royal Air Force Museum Cosford.
A preserved BS.605 is part of the engine collection on display at the Rolls-Royce Heritage Trust in Derby.

Specifications

See also

References

Aircraft rocket engines
BS605
Rocket engines using hot cycle hydrogen peroxide propellant
JATO